Jacob Fox (born Jacob Licht in 1984) is an American mathematician. He is a professor at Stanford University. His research interests are in Hungarian-style combinatorics, particularly Ramsey theory, extremal graph theory, combinatorial number theory, and probabilistic methods in combinatorics.

Fox grew up in West Hartford, Connecticut and attended Hall High School. As a senior he won second place overall and first place in his category in the annual Intel Science Talent Search,
also winning the Karl Menger Memorial Prize of the American Mathematical Society for his project. The project was titled "Rainbow Ramsey Theory: Rainbow Arithmetic Progressions and Anti-Ramsey Results"
and was based on a research project he did at a six-week summer camp in mathematics at the Massachusetts Institute of Technology (MIT);
he also participated in an earlier high school mathematics program at Ohio State University.

Fox became an undergraduate at MIT, and was awarded the 2006 Morgan Prize for several research publications in combinatorics.

Fox completed his PhD in 2010 from Princeton University; his dissertation, supervised by Benny Sudakov, was titled Ramsey Numbers.

After working in the mathematics department at MIT from 2010 to 2014, he joined the faculty of Stanford University in 2015.

In 2010, Fox was awarded the Dénes Kőnig Prize, an early-career award of the Society for Industrial and Applied Mathematics Activity Group on Discrete Mathematics.
He was an invited speaker at the International Congress of Mathematicians in 2014.  He was awarded the Oberwolfach Prize in 2016.

References

External links
 

1984 births
Living people
21st-century American mathematicians
Combinatorialists
Princeton University alumni
Massachusetts Institute of Technology School of Science alumni
Massachusetts Institute of Technology School of Science faculty
Stanford University faculty
People from West Hartford, Connecticut
Recipients of the Presidential Early Career Award for Scientists and Engineers